is a Japanese actress and model who is affiliated with Platinum Production.

Biography

Nanao started entertainment activities in 2009 when she was 20 years old, she was a regular model as a martial arts ring girl and race queen in the magazine Pinky which became a turning point, she won the Miss TGC of Tokyo Girls Collection and the 2010 Sanai Mizugi Image Girl and was a fashion model for Non-no.

In 2011, she became an exclusive model for the magazine Ginger. Nanao was also notable as a tarento from her activities. She has appeared in various fashion magazines, television commercials, dramas, and variety shows.

Filmography

TV series

Films

Japanese dub

References

External links
Official website at Platinum Production 
 
 
 

Japanese female models
Japanese gravure models
Japanese film actresses
Japanese television actresses
Japanese voice actresses
1988 births
Living people
Actors from Saitama Prefecture
Models from Saitama Prefecture
21st-century Japanese actresses